Branko Jorović (born November 27, 1981) is a Serbian professional basketball coach and former player who serves as the U-19 head coach for Crvena zvezda mts. He played both the small forward and power forward positions.

Playing career 
A forward, Jorović played for Borac Čačak, FMP Železnik, Olympias Patras, Swisslion Takovo, Kavala, Braunschweig, Igokea, and U BT Cluj-Napoca. He retired as a player with Cluj-Napoca in 2016.

National team career
Jorović was a member of the Serbia and Montenegro national team at the 2006 FIBA World Championship in Japan. Previously, he won a gold medal at the 2003 Summer Universiade in Daegu.

Coaching career 
In October 207, Jorović was named an assistant coach for Bosna Royal. He left Bosnia in December 2017. In December 2019, he signed for Železničar Čačak.

In July 2022, Jorović became the head coach for Kolubara LA 2003 of the Basketball League of Serbia. However, Crvena zvezda mts added him to their coaching staff as an assistant coach, on 9 July 2022. On 19 November 2022, the club parted ways with his following the head coach change. Five days later, on 24 November, Crvena zvezda mts hired him as the U-19 team head coach.

Career achievements 
As player:
 Adriatic League champion: 2 (with FMP Železnik: 2003–04, 2005–06)
 Championship of Bosnia and Herzegovina champion: 3  (with Igokea: 2012–13, 2013–14, 2014–15)
 Serbian Cup winner: 1 (with FMP Železnik: 2004–05)
 Bosnia and Herzegovina Cup winner: 2 (with Igokea: 2012–13, 2014–15)

References

External links
 Branko Jorović at aba-liga.com
 Branko Jorović at balkanleague.net
 Branko Jorović at archive.fiba.com

1981 births
Living people
ABA League players
Basketball Löwen Braunschweig players
Basketball players from Čačak
Kavala B.C. players
KK Klik Arilje coaches
KK Borac Čačak players
KK Crvena zvezda assistant coaches
KK Crvena zvezda youth coaches
KK FMP (1991–2011) players
KK Igokea players
KK Lions/Swisslion Vršac players
KK Železničar Čačak coaches
Olympias Patras B.C. players
Power forwards (basketball)
Serbian men's basketball coaches
Serbian expatriate basketball people in Bosnia and Herzegovina
Serbian expatriate basketball people in Germany
Serbian expatriate basketball people in Greece
Serbian expatriate basketball people in Romania
Serbian men's basketball players
Small forwards
2006 FIBA World Championship players
Universiade medalists in basketball
Universiade gold medalists for Serbia and Montenegro
Medalists at the 2003 Summer Universiade